Evert-Jan Axel Charles 't Hoen (born 8 November 1975 in Alphen aan den Rijn) is a Dutch baseball player.

't Hoen represented the Netherlands at the 1996 Summer Olympics in Atlanta, in which the Dutch finished sixth. He also participated in the 2000 Summer Olympics in Sydney, where they finished fifth, and the 2004 Summer Olympics in Athens, where they finished sixth.

External links

't Hoen at the Dutch Olympic Archive

1975 births
Living people
Arkansas Travelers players
Baseball coaches
Baseball managers
Baseball players at the 1996 Summer Olympics
Baseball players at the 2000 Summer Olympics
Baseball players at the 2004 Summer Olympics
Baseball second basemen
Baseball shortstops
Baseball third basemen
Boise Hawks players
Cedar Rapids Kernels players
Dutch expatriate baseball players in Canada
Dutch expatriate baseball players in the United States
Edmonton Trappers players
Erie SeaWolves players
Olympic baseball players of the Netherlands
Salt Lake Stingers players
Sportspeople from Alphen aan den Rijn